Morje v času mrka is a novel by Slovenian author Mate Dolenc. It was first published in 2001.

The story is an homage to Hemingway's novel The Old Man and the Sea. After him, a film of the same name was made in 2008, directed by Jure Pervanje.

References

See also
List of Slovenian novels

Slovenian novels
2000 novels